Everyone Alive Wants Answers is an album by Colleen, released in 2003, re-released in 2016.

Track listing
"Everyone Alive Wants Answers" – 3:31
"Ritournelle" – 3:09
"Carry-Cot" – 1:53
"Your Heart on Your Sleeve" – 2:46
"Goodbye Sunshine" – 2:48
"One Nights and It's Gone" – 3:42
"Long Live Mice in the Metro" – 2:50
"I Was Deep in a Dream and I Didn't Know It" – 2:56
"Babies" – 3:34
"Sometimes on a Happy Cloud" – 1:55
"A Swimming Pool Down the Railway Track" – 4:14
"In the Train With No Lights" – 2:02
"Nice and Simple" – 4:20

Samples
"Your Heart on Your Sleeve" contains a sample from the song "Here She Comes Now", by The Velvet Underground.

References

External links 
 "Essential Listening – Everyone Alive Wants Answers“ at artistxite

Colleen (musician) albums
2003 albums
The Leaf Label albums